In Germanic cosmology, Midgard (an anglicised form of Old Norse  ; Old English , Old Saxon , Old High German , and Gothic Midjun-gards; "middle yard", "middle enclosure") is the name for Earth (equivalent in meaning to the Greek term , "inhabited") inhabited by and known to humans in early Germanic cosmology. The Old Norse form plays a notable role in Norse cosmology.

Etymology

The Old Norse name  is cognate with Gothic  (attested in the Gospel of Luke as a translation of the Greek ), Old Saxon  (in Heliand), Old High German  (in Muspilli), and Old English .

In early Germanic cosmology, it stands alongside the term world (cf. Old English , Old Saxon , Old High German , Old Frisian , Old Norse ), itself from a Common Germanic compound *wira-alđiz ("man-age"), which refers to the inhabited world, i.e. the realm of humankind.

Old Norse
In Norse mythology, Miðgarðr became applied to the wall around the world that the gods constructed from the eyebrows of the giant Ymir as a defense against the Jotuns who lived in Jotunheim, east of Manheimr, the "home of men", a word used to refer to the entire world. The gods slew the giant Ymir, the first created being, and put his body into the central void of the universe, creating the world out of his body: his flesh constituting the land, his blood the oceans, his bones the mountains, his teeth the cliffs, his hairs the trees, and his brains the clouds. Ymir's skull was held by four dwarfs, Nordri, Sudri, Austri, and Vestri, who represent the four points on the compass and became the dome of heaven. The sun, moon, and stars were said to be scattered sparks in the skull.

According to the Eddas, Midgard will be destroyed at Ragnarök, the battle at the end of the world. Jörmungandr (also known as the Midgard Serpent or World Serpent) will arise from the ocean, poisoning the land and sea with his venom and causing the sea to rear up and lash against the land. The final battle will take place on the plain of Vígríðr, following which Midgard and almost all life on it will be destroyed, with the earth sinking into the sea only to rise again, fertile and green when the cycle repeats and the creation begins again.

Although most surviving instances of the word Midgard refer to spiritual matters, it was also used in more mundane situations, as in the Viking Age runestone poem from the inscription Sö 56 from Fyrby:

English
The name middangeard occurs six times in the Old English epic poem Beowulf, and is the same word as Midgard in Old Norse. The term is equivalent in meaning to the Greek term Oikoumene, as referring to the known and inhabited world.

The concept of Midgard occurs many times in Middle English. The association with earth (OE eorðe) in Middle English middellærd, middelerde is by popular etymology; the modern English cognate of geard "enclosure" is yard. An early example of this transformation is from the Ormulum:

þatt ure Drihhtin wollde / ben borenn i þiss middellærd

that our Lord wanted / be born in this Middle-earth.

The usage of "Middle-earth" as a name for a setting was popularized by Old English scholar J. R. R. Tolkien in his The Lord of the Rings and other fantasy works; he was originally inspired by the references to middangeard and Éarendel in the Old English poem Crist A.

Old High German and Old Saxon
Mittilagart is mentioned in the 9th-century Old High German Muspilli (v. 54) meaning "the world" as opposed to the sea and the heavens:

Sea is swallowed, flaming burn the heavens,
Moon falls, Midgard burns

Middilgard is also attested in the Old Saxon Heliand:

Over the middle earth;
And all men He could help

References

Locations in Norse mythology
Religious cosmologies
Earth in religion